Oscar Malker Hilding Wiberg (October 11, 1904 – August 14, 1989) was an American football player. 

Wiberg was born in 1904 in Edgar, Nebraska, and attended Edgar High School. He played college football as a fullback for the Nebraska Wesleyan Coyotes from 1923 to 1926. He was selected as captain of Nebraska Wesleyan's 1925 team. He also competed for the track team and set a North Central Conference record in the shot put.

He played professional football in the National Football League (NFL) as a back for the Cleveland Bulldogs (1927), Detroit Wolverines (1928), New York Giants (1930), Brooklyn Dodgers (1932), and Cincinnati Reds (1933). He appeared in 44 NFL games, 35 as a starter, totaling 10 touchdowns, nine extra points, and 71 points scored. He also played for the Passaic Red Devils from 1932 and 1933.

Wiberg died in 1989 in Gering, Nebraska.

References

1904 births
1989 deaths
Cleveland Bulldogs players
Detroit Wolverines (NFL) players
New York Giants players
Brooklyn Dodgers (NFL) players
Cincinnati Reds (NFL) players
Players of American football from Nebraska